Atif (also spelled Atef or Atiph) is an Arabic masculine given name generally used in the Muslim world, it means "the kind one".

Given name

Atef
 Atef Abu Saif (born 1973), Palestinian writer
 Atef Adwan (born 1950), Palestinian politician
 Atef Bseiso (1948–1992), Palestine Liberation Organization head of intelligence
 Atef Dkhili (born 1990), Tunisian footballer
 Atef Ebeid (1932–2014), Egyptian politician
 Atef Maoua, Tunisian basketball player
 Atef Najib, Syrian political security chief in the city of Daraa
 Atef Saad (born 1988), Tunisian long-distance runner
 Atef Sadat (1948–1973), Egyptian Air Force pilot
 Atef Salem (1927–2002), Egyptian film director
 Atef Sedky (1930–2005), Egyptian politician
 Atef Tarawneh (born 1954), Jordanian politician
 Atef El-Tayeb (1947–1995), Egyptian film director

Atif
 Atif Abdelmageed, Sudanese administrator
 Atif Ali (born 1984), Pakistani cricketer
 Atif Aslam (born 1983), Pakistani singer
 Atif Ashraf (born 1980), Pakistani cricketer
 Atif Bashir (born 1985), German footballer
 Atif Butt (born 1969), Pakistani-born Danish cricketer
 Atif Dudaković (born 1953), Bosnian army general
 Atif Jabbar (born 1990), Pakistani cricketer
 Atif Mian, American economist
 Atif Qarni (born 1978), American teacher and politician
 Atif Rauf (born 1964), Pakistani cricketer
 Atif Sheikh (born 1991), English cricketer

Atıf
 İskilipli Mehmed Atıf Hoca (1875–1926), Turkish Imam, Islamic scholar, and author
 Atıf Yılmaz Batıbeki (1925–2006), Turkish film director, screenwriter, and film producer

Surname

Atef
Bahram Atef (born 1941), Iranian football manager and academic
Emily Atef (born 1973), French-Iranian director, screenwriter and producer based in Berlin
Mohammed Atef Al-Masri (born Sobhi Abu Setta, also known as Abu Hafs al-Masri), the military chief of al-Qaida, and was considered one of Osama Bin Laden's two deputies, the other being Ayman Al Zawahiri
Momen Atef (born 1994), Egyptian footballer
Salah Atef, commonly known as Rico (born 1989), Egyptian footballer

Atif
Kamran Atif, member of Harkat-ul Mujahideen al-Alami
Mohammad Atif Ali (born 1982), Emirati cricketer

Arabic-language surnames
Arabic masculine given names
Bosniak masculine given names
Bosnian masculine given names
Turkish masculine given names
Pakistani masculine given names